Oshirarika Dam  is a rockfill dam located in Hokkaido Prefecture in Japan. The dam is used for irrigation. The catchment area of the dam is 87 km2. The dam impounds about 120  ha of land when full and can store 10979 thousand cubic meters of water. The construction of the dam was started on 1953 and completed in 1966.

References

Dams in Hokkaido